Chorhli is a village in Khagaria district in Bihar, India. It is situated on the bank of river Koshi, it has a mixed culture and is a very peaceful village. Even after 60 yrs of Indian independence village is struggling for its existence. People are nice and innocent here. This village has been victim of soil erosion of the river Koshi. It was destroyed by Koshi (a river, which is called sorrow of Bihar). This village had a glorious and tall Shiva temple, a magnificent mosque Jama Masjid and two middle schools,

Villages in Khagaria district